Wardour may refer to:

 Vale of Wardour, a valley in Wiltshire, England
 Wardour, Wiltshire, a village and former parish
 Wardour Castle, a ruined castle
 New Wardour Castle, a country house
 Wardour, a neighborhood in Annapolis, Maryland

See also 
 Wardour Street, Soho, London
 Baron Arundell of Wardour